Vlasyevo (Ilgaksı) is a rural locality (a selo) in Ust-Koksinsky District, the Altai Republic, Russia. The population was 11 as of 2016. There is 1 street.

Geography 
Vlasyevo is located 10 km northwest of Ust-Koksa (the district's administrative centre) by road. Ust-Koksa is the nearest rural locality.

References 

Rural localities in Ust-Koksinsky District